ProgressNow, previously the Rocky Mountain Progressive Network, is a progressive 501(c)(4) advocacy organization in the United States. Founded in 2003, ProgressNow bills itself as a network of state based communications hubs which act as a marketing department for progressive ideas.

History and mission 

ProgressNow was created in 2003 as a response to the libertarian Independence Institute.  It has since grown a subscriber base of more than 350,000 grassroots activists in Colorado. In 2006, ProgressNow began to expand its network outside of Colorado and has since created ProgressNow Partners Networks in twenty-one states: Alliance for a Better Minnesota, Alliance for a Better Utah, Battle Born Progress (formerly ProgressNow Nevada), Better Georgia, Better Idaho, Courage Campaign (California), Fuse Washington, Granite State Progress (New Hampshire), Keystone Progress (Pennsylvania), One Wisconsin Now, ProgressNow Arizona, ProgressNow Colorado, Progress Florida, ProgressIowa, Progress Michigan, Progress Missouri, ProgressNow New Mexico, Progress North Carolina, ProgressOhio, Progress Texas, and ProgressVirginia. As of 2015, the organization reported that it had an email list of over four million names.

The first chairman was Rollie Heath, a Boulder executive who gained office as the 18th district's state senator in 2008. Heath was followed by Dr. Albert Yates, the former president of Colorado State University. The founder of ProgressNow is Michael Huttner, a Brown University and University of California Hastings College of Law graduate and lawyer turned political strategist.  The current executive director is Arshad Hasan, who previously led Democracy for America.

Its founding board members included Wes Boyd, founder of MoveOn.org,  Rob McKay, chairman of the board of the Democracy Alliance and president of the McKay Family Foundation, Jared Polis, elected in 2008 as the U.S. Congressman for Colorado’s 2nd District, and Ted Trimpa (the current chair), an attorney and government relations expert.

The group co-sponsored a blogging workspace, 'The Big Tent', during the 2008 Democratic National Convention.  In 2007, progressnow.org received multiple honors from the Golden Dot Awards (online political advocacy awards).

In 2010, the book The Blueprint:  How Democrats Won Colorado, and Why Republicans Everywhere Should Care by Adam Schrager and Rob Witwer described ProgressNow as the "crown jewel" of the progressive investors' effort to flip the state.

Affordable Care Act advocacy
In October 2013, ProgressNow Colorado released a controversial series of advertisements promoting Obamacare. According to the Denver Post, one advertisement "features a woman flashing a thumbs up with one hand and holding a packet of birth-control pills in the other. She is wrapped in a man's arm next to text that includes the sentence 'Let's hope he's as easy to get as this birth control.'" In response to inquiries about whether taxpayer funding was used for the advertising campaign, the executive director of ProgressNow Colorado said, "I know some people are saying this is a taxpayer-funded campaign...but that is just not the case." ProgressNow said the series of advertisements was paid for with donations and individual contributions, and the organization denied association with state agencies.

Plagiarism claims
In November 2013, ProgressNow Michigan released a report critiquing the Mackinac Center, a Michigan-based, free-market think tank. Portions of the report were copied, without attribution, from a 2011 article in Mother Jones. The report also copied an explanatory note from a report written by the Center for Media and Democracy. After accusations of plagiarism were published in the Daily Caller, ProgressNow changed the passages in question and added a disclaimer to the front page of the report, stating "An earlier version of this report inadvertently left out two citations, which have been included in this version."

Cardboard Cory
ProgressNow Colorado was notably a part of a four year campaign to oppose Republican U.S. Senator Cory Gardner. A group of activists and ProgressNow came up with the concept of a cardboard cutout of Garner, and developed and participated in events, press conferences, and rallies with the stand-in from 2017 until Gardner's defeat in 2020.

See also
 Democracy Alliance
 MoveOn.org

References

External links
 

Political advocacy groups in the United States
Progressive organizations in the United States